Kanevo is a rural locality (a village) in Sidorovskoye Rural Settlement, Gryazovetsky District, Vologda Oblast, Russia. The population was 6 as of 2002.

Geography 
Kanevo is located 39 km northeast of Gryazovets (the district's administrative centre) by road. Zasechnoye is the nearest rural locality.

References 

Rural localities in Gryazovetsky District